Press Club are an Australian punk group. Their debut single, "Headwreck", was released in May 2017, and their debut album, Late Teens, was released in May 2018.
 
Their third album was supposed to be recorded in Germany in 2020, but did not occur due to the Covid-19 pandemic. In October 2022, drummer Frank Lees said in a statement, "The album is a culmination of years of downtime and introspection, false starts and disappointments, bushfires and pandemics. Factors that forced us to dig out parts of ourselves to sculpt a body of work that was as uncompromising and raw as our previous releases, but executed with more polish and finesse than we thought ourselves capable of." The album was released on 14 October 2022.

Discography

Albums

References

 
Musical groups from Melbourne
2017 establishments in Australia
Musical groups established in 2017
Australian punk rock groups